The Delaware Breakwater is a set of breakwaters east of Lewes, Delaware on Cape Henlopen that form Lewes Harbor. They were listed on the National Register of Historic Places on December 12, 1976.

The original  and  breakwaters were built in 1828. The breakwaters are now included in the National Harbor of Refuge and Delaware Breakwater Harbor Historic District.

The stone for the breakwater were quarried from what later became Bellevue Lake in New Castle County. The breakwaters were the first structure of their kind to be built in the Americas.

See also
Delaware Breakwater East End Light

References

Buildings and structures on the National Register of Historic Places in Delaware
Infrastructure completed in 1828
Breakwaters
Transportation buildings and structures in Sussex County, Delaware
Buildings and structures in Lewes, Delaware
National Register of Historic Places in Sussex County, Delaware